Värmdö HC, also known as Värmdö Hockey, is a Swedish ice hockey club located on the island of Värmdö. The club will play the 2017 –18 season in group East of Hockeytvåan, the fourth tier of Swedish ice hockey. The club plays its home games in Ekhallen, which has a capacity of 500 spectators.

References

External links
Official website
Club profile on Eliteprospects.com

Sporting clubs in Stockholm
Ice hockey teams in Sweden
1975 establishments in Sweden
Ice hockey clubs established in 1975
Ice hockey teams in Stockholm County